Teresa Zielewicz (25 February 1950 in Szamotuły, Poland – 20 July 2011 in Vienna, Austria) was a Polish and later Austrian handball player.

She first represented her home country Poland, playing 63 matches and scoring 170 goals between February 26, 1970 (friendly match against Norway) and June 19, 1977 (friendly match against Hungary). She appeared at the world championships in 1973 (5th place) and 1975 (7th place). 

In 1980, she went in Austria to play for HypoBank Südstadt. She then represented Austria at the 1983 B World Championship (8th place) and at the 1984 Summer Olympics in Los Angeles (6th place).

References

External links

1950 births
2011 deaths
Polish female handball players
Austrian female handball players
Olympic handball players of Austria
Handball players at the 1984 Summer Olympics
Polish emigrants to Austria